Kewal Dheer (born 5 October 1938) is an Indian writer and author.

Early life
Dheer was born on 5 October 1938 in Gaggo, a village in Montgomery District (now in District Vehari, Pakistan). He is the eldest son of social reformer Hans Raj. Dheer attended school in Phagwara and his writing was published in local magazines. As a student he was the state office bearer for Milap Bal Sangh. Dheer received a medical degree from Patna, Bihar in 1960 and began his career as Medical Officer after completing work with the Health Department of the Government of Punjab.

Career
Dheer's book of short stories, "Dharti-Ro-Pari," was published in 1957.  He has published ten volumes of short-stories and five novels, as well as travelogues on Pakistan, US, UK, Canada and several countries of Europe.  In the 1970s Dheer founded Adeeb International and Sahir Cultural Academy.  Dheer has written books on literature, psychology, human behaviour, medicine that have published in Urdu, Hindi, English, and Punjabi. He has also written television, theatre and film including Vachan, Sheeshe-Ki-Diwar,' and Gumrah. Dheer has worked as an editor for Swatantrata Weekly (1958–1960), The Signature (2000), Qamar Monthly (1967), Kitab Numa (July 2004) and Adeeb (2010).

Awards
 1958– Bihar Pragatisheel Sahitya Parishad State Award on Hindi short story collection "Dharti-Ro-Pari".
 1963– Bhasha Vibhag, Govt. of Punjab State Award on Technical Literature.
 1981– Indo-Pak Urdu Fiction Award instituted by "Biswin Sadi", New Delhi.
 1981– AOHW Asian Award for Human Welfare through literature.
 1983– Bhasha Vibhag, Govt. of Punjab State Award on Urdu short story collection "Bikhri Hui Zindgi".
 1983– U.P. Urdu Academy, Govt. of Uttar Pradesh State Award on Urdu short story collection "Bikhri Hui Zindgi".
 1985– U.P. Urdu Academy, Govt. of Uttar Pradesh State Award on Urdu short story collection "Apna Daman Apni Aag".
 1986– Punjab Hindi Sahitya Parishad Literary Award on overall contribution to Hindi literature.
 1986– Bihar Urdu Academy, Govt. of Bihar State Award on Urdu story Collection "Bikhri Hui Zindgi".
 1987– Prof. Mohan Singh Memorial Award on Punjabi short story collection "Lahu Da Rang".
 1987– "Honour of Peace" Award by International University of Peace, Canada on English short story collection "Bonds of Love".
 1988– "National Integration Award" by Hindi-Urdu Sangam, U.P.
 1989– "Munshi Prem Chand Fiction Award" by Ghalib Cultural Academy, Karnataka.
 1997– "Literary Personality of the Year Award" by Progressive Writers Association, UK
 1997– "Shiromani Urdu Sahityakar Award", the highest literary award of the Govt. of Punjab.
 2000– "European Urdu Writers Society London's "Prem Chand International Fiction Award".
 2000– "Bhasha Vibhag, Govt. of Punjab State Award on Urdu short story collection "Kahaniyan".
 2000– UK Hindi Samiti, London's gold medal, for contribution to Hindi literature.
 2000– Award of Excellence by Indo-Canadian Times, Vancouver Canada.
 2001– Millenium Award by Ghalib Cultural Academy, Karnataka.
 2003– Qartas – e – Aizaz Literary Award by "Chaharsoo" (Pakistan).
 2007– Indo – Pak Friendship Award, Pakistan.
 2008– Sahitya Shree Samman by Rashtriya Sahitya Parishad, New Delhi.
 2011– Pride of Urdu Award, Pakistan.
 2011– National Honour by House of Commons, Canada for promotion of universal brotherhood and 
        Global Peace Through Literature.
 
 2011– State Honour by Legislative Assembly of Ontario, Canada.
 2012– Sultan Baho Award-2012 Pakistan.
 2012– Urdu Hindi Sahitya Committee Award, Lucknow.
 2013– Ambassador for Peace Award by SAARC Organisation for Sufism, Islamabad, Pakistan
 2013– Sat Paul Mittal Award of Appreciation to Service of Society through Literature by Nehru 
        Sidhant Kender Trust, Ludhiana, India.The Award carries Rs. One Lac.
 2015- Lifetime Achievement award by The Asian Literary Foundation Inc. USA. The Award carrie 
        a sum of US$5000 and a Citation.
 2016- National Award by Ministry of HRD, Govt. of India on Hindi Book "Dastak Yadon Ki". The 
        Award carries Rs. One Lac and a Citation.                                                                                                        
 2019- U.P.Urdu Academy Best Book award on Urdu book "Safar Jaari Hai"

Publications 
Latest Publications:SAFAR JARI HAE (Interviews and Memoirs in Urdu) Published in 2017 by Arshia Publications, New Delhiand LOVE STORIES FROM INDIA (Short stories in Urdu)Published in 2016 by Sangemeel Publications, Lahore, Pakistan  , 13: 978-969-35-2943-2
1. The Last Waltz (2015) Short Stories in English. Published by Authors Press, New Delhi 
2. Dastak Yadon Ki (2014) Memoirs in Hindi. Published by Akshardham Prakashan, Kaithal (Haryana) 
3. Ham Dono (2014) Short Story Collection in Hindi. Published by Star Publications Ltd., New Delhi 

4. Manto Mera Dost (2014) Revised nd Enlarged 2nd edition. Published by Educational Publishing House, Delhi 
5. Manto: Adab -Aurat Aur Jins (year 2013) Published by Educational Publishing House, Delhi 

6. Badchalan (Urdu) (Year 2007) Published by Educational Publishing House, Delhi 
7. Yadon-Ke-Khandar (Urdu) (Year 2008) Published by Safeena-e-Adab, Lahore
8. Kahaniyan (Urdu) (Year 1999) Published by Adeeb International (Sahir Cultural Academy) Ludhiana 
9. Apna Daman Apni Aag (Urdu) (Year 1985) Published by Shan-e-Hind Publishers, New Delhi.
10. Bikhari-Hui-Zindagi (Urdu) (Year 1983) Published by Shama Book Depot, New Delhi.
11.Bonds of Love (English) (Year 1987) Published by Central Publishers, Ludhiana.
12.Dharti-Ro-Padi (Hindi) (Year 1958) Published by Parbhati Prakashan, Patna.
13.Lahu-Ka-Rang (Hindi) (Year 1989) Published by Central Publishers, Ludhiana.
14.Katha Yatra (Punjabi) (Year 2004) Published by Adeeb International (Sahir Cultural Academy), Ludhiana
15.Lahu-Da-Rang (Punjabi) (Year 1986) Published by Central Publishers, Ludhiana.

Novels
15. Sanjh Ki Parchhaiyan (Hindi) (Year 1967)Published by Mansarovar Publications, Allahabad (Regd. No. 6125/57)
16. Itni Si Baat (Hindi) (Year 1968) Published by Mansarovar Publications Allahabad (Regd. No. 6125/57)
17. Raakh Ki Parten (Hindi) (Year 1969) Published by Mansarovar Prakashan, Allahabad (Regd. No. 6125/57)
18. Sheeshe-Ki-Deewar (Hindi) (Year 1970) Published by Hindi Milap, Jalandhar

Travelouges
19. Khushboo-Ka-Safar (Urdu) (Year 1988) Travelouge on Pakistan, Published by Modern Publishing House, Delhi.
20. Gori-Ke-Desh Me (Urdu) (Year 1996) Travelouge on North America and Europe. Published by Hind Samachar, Jalandhar.
21. Mehak Da Safar (Punjabi) (Year 1989) Travelouge on Pakistan. Published by Jagbani, Jalandhar.
22. Khushboo-Ka-Safar (Hindi) (Year 1987) Published by Punjab Kesari, Jalandhar.

Memoirs
 Manto Mera Dost (Hindi) (Year 1961) Published by Jyoti Books, Patna.
 Manto Mera Dost (Urdu) (Year 1962) Published by Mashwara Book Depot, Delhi.
 Nehru Ne Kaha (Hindi) (Year 1964) Published by Hind Pocket Books, Delhi.
 Jawahar Lal Nehru (Urdu) (Year 1964) Published by Manshwara Book Depot, Delhi.
 Rashtranayak Shastri (Hindi) (Year 1966) Published by Eagle Pocket Books, Ghaziabad.
 Yudh Ke Morche Par (Hindi) (Year 1966) Published by Hind Pocket Books, Delhi.
 Yadon Ki Dastak (Urdu) (Year 2012) Published by Aalmi Urdu Trust, Delhi.
 Safar Jaari Hai (Urdu) (Year 2017) Published by Arshia Publications, Delhi. .
 Mai Lahore Hoon (Hindi) (Year 2019) Published by Unistar Publications, Chandigarh. .

Books on Health, Family Welfare and Sex Education Dr. Kewal Dheer has written more than three dozen educational books on the subjects of Health, Family Welfare and Sex Education in Hindi, Urdu and Punjabi languages. These books have been published by Manoj Publications, Delhi/ Start Publications, Delhi/ Anand Paperbacks, Delhi/ N.D. Sehgal & Sons Publishers, Delhi/ Shama Book Depot, Delhi and many others. Languages Department Govt. of Punjab and A.O.H.W. awarded books on Family Planning.

Translations
 Nadi Kinare (Year 2012) (Urdu to Hindi). Novel by Abdaal bela, Translated by Dr. Kewal Dheer, published by Sang-e-meel Publications, Lahore, Pakistan. 
 Tum (Year 2012) (Urdu to Hindi). Novel by Abdaal Bela, Translated by Dr. Kewal Dheer, published by Sangemeel Publications, Lahore, Pakistan. 
 Shah Saien (Year 2012) (Urdu to Hindi). Novel by Abdaal bela, Translated by Dr. Kewal Dheer, published by Sang-e-meel Publications, Lahore, Pakistan. 
 Urmila (Year 2012) (Urdu to Hindi). Novel by Abdaal bela, Translated by Dr. Kewal Dheer, published by Sang-e-meel Publications, Lahore, Pakistan.
 Lal Qila (Urdu to Hindi). Novel by Abdaal bela, Translated by Dr. Kewal Dheer, published by Sang-e-meel Publications, Lahore, Pakistan. 
 Batwara (Urdu to Hindi). Novel by Abdaal bela, Translated by Dr. Kewal Dheer, published by Sangemeel Publications, Lahore, Pakistan.
 Darwaza Khulta Hai (Urdu to Hindi). Novel by Abdaal bela, Translated by Dr. Kewal Dheer, published by Sang-e-meel Publications, Lahore, Pakistan.
 Note : 'Darwaza Khulta Hai' is a novel of 1800 pages, written in Urdu by Abdaal bela nad translated into Hindi by Dr. Kewal Dheer. This is a historical document of fiction on cultural history of un-divided India and dedicated to relations Friendship. It has been published by premier publishing house Sang-e-meel Publications, Lahore and created history by becoming the first ever publisher/printer of a Hindi book in Pakistan.

Television and Radio
 T.V. Serial 'Vachan' (13 Episodes) produced by Doordarshan, Jalandhar (Year 1984).
 T.V. serial 'Sheeshe-Ki-Deewar' (13 Episodes) produced by Doordarshan, Jalandhar (Year 1985)
 T.V. play 'Gumrah' produced by Doordarshan Jalandhar (Year 1984)
 T.V. Film, 'Indira Priyadarshani' on assassination of Mrs. Indira Gandhi produced by Doordarshan Jalandhar (Year 1984).
 T.V. Film 'Boond Boond Sagar' on cultural history of Punjab produced by Doordarshan Jalandhar (Year 1985).
 Literary T.V. programme 'Karwan' and more than fifty other plays/ features/ interviews were scripted/ anchored for Doordarshan.
 More than two hundred Radio Programmes (Short Stories/ plays/ talks/ interviews) have been written/ broadcast by all India Radio/ Akashvani since year 1965.

Further reading
 Dr. Kewal Dheer : Adabi Safar Ke Pachas Baras (Urdu) edited by Makhmoor Syedi, Md. Zaman Azurda and Sheen Kaf Nizam. Published by Educational Publishing House Delhi .
 Golden Harvest: 50 Year Literary Journey of Dr. Kewal Dheer. Edited by Prof. M.S. Cheema. Published by Adeeb International, Ludhiana.
 Dr. Kewal Dheer Number of 'Parwaz-e-Adab', monthly issue January- February 1999, published by Languages Department, Govt. of Punjab, Patiala, Regd. No. 33860/79.
 Special Number of Monthly Chahar Soo, Rawalpindi, Pakistan Regd. No. N.P.R. 063, Vol. 12 No. 1-2 (Jan–Feb 2003).
 Special Number of Monthly 'Shair', Mumbai, India Regd. No. MH/MR/ South – 134/2006-08. Vol. 78-No. 10 (October 2007).
 Special Number of Monthly Takhleeq, Lahore, Pakistan Regd. No. LRL-64, Vol. 36 No. 12 (December 2005).
 Special Number of "Bazgasht", edited by Jamshed Masroor, published from Oslo, Norway,  (1997).
 Dheer, Kewal in Encyclopaedia of Indian Literature, Sahitya Akademi, New Delhi 1993, .
 Celebrating Dreams-75 Year Journey of Dr. Kewal Dheer- Biography Through Images(Coffee Table Book Edited by Lalit Berry) (English) (2013) Published by Star Publications Pvt. Ltd. New Delhi 

FILMS ABOUT DR. KEWAL DHEER
 SHAKHSIYAT- a Documentary Film on Dr. Kewal Dheer produced by Rajya Sabha Television, New Delhi.
 CHEHRE- a Film based on Interview with Dr. Kewal Dheer by Dr. Perwaiz Parwaizi, Rawal T.V. Toronto, Canada.
 TALK SHOW with Ashfaq Hussain on Asia Television Network, Toronto, Canada.
 MORNING WITH FARAH- Live Talk Show with Farah on ATV, Islamabad, Pakistan.
 TALK SHOW with Saeeda Afzal on PTV, Islamabad, Pakistan.
 INTERVIEW ON URDU TV CANADA with Taslim Elahi Zulfi in Toronto.
 Documentary Film on Dr. Kewal Dheer produced by DD Punjabi Television, Jalandhar.
 WALK WITH TALK TV Show with Raees Sidiqui on DD Urdu Television, Delhi

See also
 List of Indian writers

References

https://www.scribd.com/doc/177450025/Yadoon-Ki-Dastak-Kewal-Dheer-Aalmi-Urdu-Trust-Dehli-2012 
یادوں کی دستک، کیول دھیر
 عالمی اردو ٹرسٹ دہلی-2012

External links
  Official website

Urdu-language fiction
1938 births
Living people
People from Vehari District